Takashi Ono may refer to:

Takashi Ono (mathematician) (小野孝, born 1928), Japanese-American mathematician
Takashi Ono (gymnast) (小野喬, born 1931), Japanese gymnast
Takashi Ono (judoka) (小野卓志, born 1980), Japanese judoka

See also
Takashi Ohno, American politician